Alexandra Canal may refer to:
Alexandra Canal (New South Wales), in Sydney, New South Wales, Australia
Alexandra Canal, Singapore; see List of rivers of Singapore